The San Juan metropolitan area is a United States Census Bureau defined metropolitan statistical area (MSA) in northeastern Puerto Rico centered around the city of San Juan. A July 1, 2009, Census Bureau estimate placed the population at 2,617,089, a 4.31% increase over the 2000 census figure of 2,509,007.

San Juan Metro Area (Área Metro) 

The unofficial but colloquial San Juan metropolitan area (in Spanish; área metropolitana de San Juan, abbreviated AMSJ), also referred to as the Área Metro is the sprawling area surrounding the Municipality of San Juan which includes San Juan and its conurbation of the municipalities of Bayamón, Carolina, Cataño, Guaynabo and Trujillo Alto, and in some cases it also includes Toa Baja (particularly the suburb of Levittown). After San Juan, many of these municipalities are the most populous in the commonwealth of Puerto Rico. It represents the inner urban area of the metropolitan statistical area of San Juan. This urban area is also known as the Área metro de Puerto Rico based on the misconception that San Juan is the only urbanized metropolitan area in the island.

Municipalities in the San Juan–Caguas–Guaynabo metropolitan area 
San Juan–Caguas–Guaynabo metropolitan area is the largest metropolitan area (by population) in Puerto Rico, covering approximately half of the island. Its principal cities are San Juan, Bayamón and Carolina.

A total of forty-one municipalities (Spanish: municipios) are included as part of the San Juan–Caguas–Guaynabo MSA. The total area for the MSA is 1,902.45 square miles. As of 2020, the San Juan metropolitan statistical area is the 35th most populated MSA (slightly smaller than Greater Cleveland but larger than San Jose metropolitan area in population).

Municipalities with over 100,000 inhabitants 

 San Juan (Principal city) Pop: 342,259
 Bayamón Pop: 185,187
 Carolina Pop: 154,815
 Caguas (Principal city) Pop: 127,244

Municipalities with 50,000 to 100,000 inhabitants 

 Guaynabo (Principal city) Pop: 89,780
 Arecibo Pop: 87,754
 Toa Baja Pop: 75,293
 Trujillo Alto Pop: 67,740
 Toa Alta Pop: 66,852
 Vega Baja Pop: 54,414
 Humacao Pop: 50,896

Municipalities with fewer than 50,000 inhabitants 

 Río Grande Pop: 47,060
 Canóvanas Pop: 42,337
 Cayey Pop: 41,652
 Gurabo Pop: 40,662
 Cidra Pop: 39,970
 Manatí Pop: 39,492
 Hatillo Pop: 38,486
 San Lorenzo Pop: 37,693
 Juncos Pop: 37,012
 Dorado Pop: 35,879
 Vega Alta Pop: 35,395
 Las Piedras Pop: 35,180
 Corozal Pop: 34,571
 Camuy Pop: 32,827
 Yabucoa Pop: 30,426
 Naranjito Pop: 29,241
 Barranquitas Pop: 28,893
 Morovis Pop: 28,727
 Aibonito Pop: 24,637
 Aguas Buenas Pop: 24,223
 Loíza Pop: 23,693
 Quebradillas Pop: 23,638
 Naguabo Pop: 23,386
 Cataño Pop: 23,155
 Barceloneta Pop: 22,657
 Orocovis Pop: 21,434
 Comerío Pop: 18,883
 Ciales Pop: 16,984
 Florida Pop: 11,692
 Maunabo Pop: 10,589

Combined Statistical Area

The San Juan-Caguas-Fajardo Combined Statistical Area (CSA)  includes two metropolitan areas, one micropolitan area, and forty-five municipalities. A July 1, 2009 Census Bureau estimate placed the population at 2,732,036, a 4.16% increase over the 2000 census figure of 2,622,876. The San Juan-Caguas-Fajardo Combined Statistical Area comprises 68.9% of Puerto Rico's total population. As of 2020, the San Juan combined statistical area is the 29th largest CSA (slightly smaller than Indianapolis and larger than Las Vegas in population).

Components
Metropolitan statistical areas (MSAs)
Fajardo (3 municipalities)
San Juan–Caguas–Guaynabo (41 municipalities)
Micropolitan statistical areas (µSAs)
Utuado micropolitan statistical area (1 municipality)

See also
Puerto Rico census statistical areas
List of Metropolitan Statistical Areas

References

External links

 
Metropolitan areas of Puerto Rico